Aurelio Rodríguez Vicente Carretero (1863–1917), best known simply as Aurelio Carretero, was a Spanish sculptor.

He spent a time in South America, where he became a renowned caricaturist.

Some of his work include sculptures in public spaces such as Zorrilla (1899, Valladolid), Conde Ansúrez (1900, Valladolid), Andrés Torrejón (1908, Móstoles) and Campoamor (1912, Navia).

References 

1863 births
1917 deaths
Spanish sculptors
Spanish male sculptors
People from Medina de Rioseco